Thomas W. Phillips may refer to:

 Thomas Wharton Phillips (1835–1912), member of the U.S. House of Representatives from Pennsylvania
 Thomas Wharton Phillips Jr. (1874–1956), also a member of the U.S. House of Representatives from Pennsylvania
 Thomas Williams Phillips (1883–1966), British civil servant
 Thomas W. Phillips (judge) (born 1943), federal judge to the United States District Court for the Eastern District of Tennessee

See also
 Thomas Phillips (disambiguation)